CTIC may refer to:

 Center for the Development of Information and Communication Technologies in Asturias in Spain
 Central Taiwan Innovation Campus in Taiwan
 Counterterrorist Intelligence Center